Solano County is a county located in the U.S. state of California. As of the 2020 census, its population was 453,491. The county seat is Fairfield.

Solano County comprises the Vallejo–Fairfield metropolitan statistical area, which is also included in the San Jose–San Francisco–Oakland, combined statistical area. Solano County is the northeastern county in the nine-county San Francisco Bay Area region.

A portion of the South Campus at the University of California, Davis, is in Solano County.

History

Solano County was one of the original counties of California, created in 1850 at the time of statehood.

At the request of General Mariano Guadalupe Vallejo, the county was named for Chief Solano of the Suisun people, a Native American tribe of the region and Vallejo's close ally. Chief Solano at one time led the tribes between the Petaluma River and the Sacramento River. The chief was also  called Sem-Yeto, which signifies "brave or fierce hand."  The chief was given the Spanish name Francisco Solano during baptism at the Catholic Mission, and is named after the Spanish Franciscan missionary, Father Francisco Solano. "Solano" is a common surname in the north of Spain, especially in Navarra, Zaragoza, and La Rioja.

Travis Air Force Base is located just east of Fairfield.

Region
Solano County is the easternmost county of the North Bay. As such, it is sometimes reported by news agencies as being in the East Bay. Additionally, a portion of the county extends into the Sacramento Valley, geographically.

Geography

Solano County has several inactive cinnabar mines, including the Hastings Mine and St. John's Mine, both of which are subject to ongoing mercury monitoring. These mines were worked in the first half of the twentieth century.

Flora and fauna
Solano County has a number of rare and endangered species, including the beetle Elaphrus viridis, the wildflower Lasthenia conjugens, commonly known as Contra Costa goldfields, and the annual plant Legenere limosa or false Venus' looking glass.

Adjacent counties
Contra Costa County, California - south
Sonoma County, California - west
Napa County, California - west
Yolo County, California - north
Sacramento County, California - east

National protected area
 San Pablo Bay National Wildlife Refuge (part)

Transportation

Major highways

 Interstate 80
 Interstate 505
 Interstate 680
 Interstate 780
 State Route 12
 State Route 29
 State Route 37
 State Route 84
 State Route 113

Public transportation
Solano County is served by several transit agencies:
SolTrans, formed as a merger between these two existing transit agencies:
Vallejo Transit, which also formerly operated the Baylink Ferry to San Francisco
Benicia Breeze
San Francisco Bay Ferry, with a terminal in Vallejo
Fairfield and Suisun Transit
Vacaville City Coach
Rio Vista Delta Breeze
Each agency interconnects with the others, enabling transit trips throughout the county. Service also connects with BART stations in Contra Costa County. Transit links are provided to Napa, Yolo and Sacramento counties as well.

Greyhound and Amtrak provide long-distance intercity service.

Airports
General aviation airports in Solano County that are open to the public are the Nut Tree Airport and Rio Vista Municipal Airport.

Demographics

2020 census

Note: the US Census treats Hispanic/Latino as an ethnic category. This table excludes Latinos from the racial categories and assigns them to a separate category. Hispanics/Latinos can be of any race.

2014
A 2014 analysis by The Atlantic found Solano County to be the 5th most racially diverse county in the United States, behind Aleutians West Census Area and Aleutians East Borough in Alaska, Queens County in New York, and Alameda County in California.

2011

Places by population, race, and income

2010
The 2010 United States Census reported that Solano County had a population of 413,344. The racial makeup of Solano County was 210,751 (51.0%) White, 60,750 (14.7%) African American, 3,212 (0.8%) Native American, 60,473 (14.6%) Asian, 3,564 (0.9%) Pacific Islander, 43,236 (10.5%) from other races, and 31,358 (7.6%) from two or more races.  Hispanic or Latino of any race were 99,356 persons (24.0%). At 52,641 Filipinos in the county making up 12% of the population, Solano County has the largest percentage Filipino population of any county in the United States.

2000
At the 2000 census there were 394,542 people, 130,403 households, and 97,411 families in the county. There were 134,513 housing units at an average density of 162 per square mile (63/km2). The racial makeup of the county was 56.4% White, 14.9% Black or African American, 0.8% Native American, 12.8% Asian, 0.8% Pacific Islander, 8.0% from other races, and 6.4% from two or more races.  17.64% of the population were Hispanic or Latino of any race. 8.5% were of German, 6.4% Irish and 6.0% English ancestry according to Census 2000. 75.7% spoke English, 12.1% Spanish and 6.6% Tagalog as their first language.
Of the 130,403 households 39.9% had children under the age of 18 living with them, 55.7% were married couples living together, 13.8% had a female householder with no husband present, and 25.3% were non-families. 19.6% of households were one person and 6.5% were one person aged 65 or older.  The average household size was 2.90 and the average family size was 3.33.

The age distribution was 28.3% under the age of 18, 9.2% from 18 to 24, 31.3% from 25 to 44, 21.7% from 45 to 64, and 9.5% 65 or older.  The median age was 34 years. For every 100 females there were 101.5 males.  For every 100 females age 18 and over, there were 100.2 males.

The median household income was $54,099 and the median family income  was $60,597. Males had a median income of $41,787 versus $31,916 for females. The per capita income for the county was $21,731.  About 6.1% of families and 8.3% of the population were below the poverty line, including 10.3% of those under age 18 and 6.3% of those age 65 or over.

Crime 

The following table includes the number of incidents reported and the rate per 1,000 persons for each type of offense (2011).

Cities by population and crime rates

Government and politics

Government

The Government of Solano County is defined and authorized under the California Constitution and law as a general law county. The County government provides countywide services such as elections and voter registration, law enforcement, jails, vital records, property records, tax collection, public health, and social services. In addition the County serves as the local government for all unincorporated areas.

The County government is composed of the elected five-member Board of Supervisors, several other elected offices including the Sheriff-Coroner, District Attorney, Assessor/Recorder, Auditor-Controller, and Treasurer/Tax Collector/County Clerk, and numerous county departments and entities under the supervision of the County Administrator. As of January 2013 the members of the Solano County Board of Supervisors were:

 Erin Hannigan, District 1, Vice-Chairwoman
 Monica Brown, District 2
 Jim Spering, District 3
 John Vasquez, District 4, Chairman
 Mitch Mashburn, District 5

Politics

Voter registration statistics

Overview 

Solano County has been a Democratic stronghold in presidential and congressional elections, with Californians Richard Nixon (in 1972) and Ronald Reagan (in 1980 and 1984) being the only Republicans to win the county since 1928. However, the northern area of Solano County including Vacaville and Dixon have began shifting right as evidenced by the 2022 midterms, voters in Congressional District 4 favored the Republican candidate 50.3% to 49.7%. 

  
  
  
  
  
  
  
  
  
  
  
  
  
  
  
  
  
  
  
  
  
  
  
  
  
  
  
  
  
  
  

On November 4, 2008, Solano County voted 55.82% in favor of Proposition 8, which amended the California Constitution to ban same-sex marriages. It was the only Bay Area county to approve the initiative. In the 2008 presidential election that day, Barack Obama carried the county by a 28.5% margin over John McCain, a larger margin than statewide (24%).

According to the California Secretary of State, as of February 10, 2019, Solano County has 236,028 registered voters. Of those, 106,452 (45.1%) are registered Democrats, 50,006 (21.2%) are registered Republicans, and 66,558 (28.2%) have declined to state a political party. Democrats hold voter-registration advantages in all incorporated cities and towns in Solano County. However, Republicans lead in registration in the unincorporated communities of the county (40%-35%), making Solano the only county in the Bay Area where Republicans out-number Democrats in unincorporated communities. The Democrats' largest registration advantage in Solano is in the city of Vallejo, wherein there are only 8,242 Republicans (14.6%) out of 56,313 total voters compared to 33,753 Democrats (59.9%) and 12,157 voters who have declined to state a political party (21.6%).

Communities

Cities

Benicia
Dixon
Fairfield (county seat)
Rio Vista
Suisun City
Vacaville
Vallejo

Census-designated places
Allendale
Elmira
Green Valley
Hartley

Other unincorporated communities

Bahia
Birds Landing
Bucktown
Collinsville
Cordelia
Maine Prairie
Rockville
Scandia

Population ranking

The population ranking of the following table is based on the 2020 census of Solano County.

† county seat

Miscellania

 In 1985 Humphrey the humpback whale strayed off his migration route and ended up in Shag Slough north of Rio Vista.  Rescuers from the Marine Mammal Center and other volunteers dismantled a county bridge before being able to turn him around in the narrow slough.

See also

1892 Vacaville–Winters earthquakes
List of counties in California
List of school districts in Solano County, California
National Register of Historic Places listings in Solano County, California
Solano County Library

Notes

References

External links

 
  - An early history of Solano County
 Hiking trails in Solano County

 
Counties in the San Francisco Bay Area
California counties
1850 establishments in California
Populated places established in 1850
Majority-minority counties in California